Payson High School (PHS) is a public high school located in the rural town of Payson, Arizona, United States. It is one of two high schools within Payson Unified School District. PHS enrolls approximately 750 students.

History
Payson's first schoolhouse was completed in the spring of 1938, and it served all students in the community. This first school, known as the Rock Building, continued to house high school aged students until 1955. By the 1958–59 school year, there were over 60 students that were high school age. As this population continued to increase a separate building was deemed necessary and in 1962 the construction of Payson High School (PHS) began. This same year, Ivan Wade became the first superintendent of Payson Unified School District, and the district was officially empowered to grant high school diplomas.

The first athletic programs also began in 1962, with the football program practicing in a pasture near the golf course – no home games were played that first season. By 1965, the current A-Building at the high school was open for learning and administrative offices. Without a gymnasium in these early years, high school students hustled almost one mile down the hill to use the Rock Building. Students continued to make the two-mile run, round-trip, to the Rock Building until 1967 when a gymnasium was constructed at PHS. The football field was also built this same year.

In 1979, the autos and wood shop programs moved into their current home. The academic building, also known as the B-Building, was completed in 1984. This new building providing PHS a library and nine classrooms, three of which were set up as science laboratory facilities. By the winter of 1988, the community auditorium was completed and the PHS drama department was showcasing its very first performance under the direction of John Siler. In 1988, the current Alternative to Suspension/In-School Suspension classroom was completed, although at the time it served as a small administration building.

The student population continued to grow through the 90s, and by 1994 construction began on the C-Building. This building was specifically designed to house Career Technical Education (CTE) courses, complete with a state-of-the-art kitchen, prep room, and dining room. The C-Building includes another six classrooms, three of which are computer labs.

In 1997, the Dave Wilson Dome, named after the police chief killed in the line of duty, was built. Around this same time, the current physics laboratory facility, was converted from a locker bay to a classroom by enclosing the roofed structure. Building continued in 1998, as the Stagecraft (Drama) Department received the black box theater.

In 2003, the D-Building was constructed, complete with a cafeteria capable of seating 133 students. This building includes another six classrooms, and is now the home of the English Department.

The Wendell Stevens Agricultural Building opened in 2010. This building was named in honor of Wendell Stevens, the longtime agricultural education and FFA teacher who spent his entire career at PHS and retired that same year. This facility contains a barn, classroom, machine shop, office, as well as two small animal examination and treatment rooms.

In the fall of 2010, PHS was outfitted with solar panels covering two parking lots. The energy installed on this campus and two others combined for a total of 1.45 MW of DC power. This grid-tied photovoltaic system "successfully delivered a complete turn-key, cost-effective, efficient energy solution to Payson Unified School District. At the time of groundbreaking, this was the largest PV system on a K–12 education campus in the State of Arizona." The old gymnasium was given a new roof in 2012, and was renamed "The Longhorn Gym".

Academics
Payson High School has a wide variety of academic options including offerings from Career Technical Education (CTE), Northern Arizona Vocational Institute of Technology (NAVIT), Advanced Placement (AP) and dual-credit courses that are taught on campus and provided through partnerships with Gila Community College (GCC) and Eastern Arizona College (EAC).

Extracurricular activities
The school offers a wide variety of clubs, including Chess Club, C-CAP, FCCLA, DECA, Corps of Engineers, Skills USA Engineering, FBLA, FFA, Hike and Ski, HOSA, Key Club, Link Crew, National Honor Society, Skills USA Auto, Special Olympics, Student Government, SOS Club, Skills USA Woods, Gamer Club, Peer Counseling, Adventure Club, Choir, Band, Thespians, Drama, and Musical Theatre.

Academic recognition
PHS students, programs and staff have received state and national recognition.

The Modern Choir performed at Carnegie Hall in June 2007.

Athletics
The Payson Longhorns compete mainly in the 3A – East Conference, and are a member of the Arizona Interscholastic Association (AIA), which governs most sports and competitive activities in the state of Arizona. Payson High School sponsors athletic teams in baseball, basketball, cheer, cross country, football, golf, soccer, softball, track & field, volleyball, and wrestling.

Wrestling

Boys' track & field

Girls' track & field

Girls' cross-country

Football

Boys' basketball

Baseball

Golf

References

External links
 Official website

Educational institutions established in 1962
1962 establishments in Arizona
Public high schools in Arizona
Schools in Gila County, Arizona